Brett Harvey may refer to:

 Brett Harvey (Canadian director), Canadian director, writer and cinematographer
 Brett Harvey (English director), English film writer and director
 Brett Harvey (rugby union), former New Zealand rugby union player